Santhosh Dhayanidhi is an Indian film composer and singer. He made his debut as a music composer through Inimey Ippadithan (2015).

Career
Dhayanidhi began his career in film music by working as a keyboard programmer for A. R. Rahman and worked with him for two years from the production of the albums to Kadal (2013) and Lingaa (2014). He simultaneously worked as a composer for TV commercials, notably for an ad promoting the Indian reality show Bigg Boss 8. Dhayanidhi made his debut as a composer with the film Inimey Ippadithan (2016) after being recommended to the producer by the lead actor Santhanam. Santhanam had heard about Dhayanidhi after looking for a debutant and being briefed about Santhosh by Kaushik, an employee at Sony Music India.

Discography

Released soundtracks
 The year next to the title of the affected films indicates the release year of the either dubbed or remade version in the named language later than the original version.
 • indicates original language release. Indicates simultaneous versions, if featuring in more languages
 ♦ indicates a remade version, the remaining ones being dubbed versions

Playback singer

References

External links
 

Living people
Musicians from Chennai
Tamil film score composers
Indian male film score composers
Year of birth missing (living people)